Minuscule 216 (in the Gregory-Aland numbering), α 469 (Soden), is a Greek minuscule manuscript of the New Testament, on paper. It is dated by a colophon to the year 1358. It has marginalia.

Description 
The codex contains the text of the Acts, Catholic, and Pauline epistles on 236 paper leaves (size ), with some lacunae (1 Corinthians 11:7-27; 1 Timothy 4:1-5.8). The text is written in one column per page, 27 lines per page.

It is beautifully written, with numerous corrections made by later hand.

According to the subscription at the end of the Epistle to the Romans, the Letter was written προς Ρωμαιους εγραφη απο Κορινθου δια Φοιβης της διακονου; the same subscription have manuscripts: 42, 90, 339, 462, 466, 642;

Text 
Kurt Aland the Greek text of the codex did not place in any Category.

In 1 Corinthians 2:14 it reads πνευματος (omit του θεου) along with 2, 255, 330, 440, 451, 823, 1827, and syrp.

History 
The manuscript was written by Theophanes. It was examined by Scrivener and C. R. Gregory.

It is currently housed at the Lambeth Palace (1183), at London.

See also 

 List of New Testament minuscules
 Biblical manuscript
 Textual criticism

References

Further reading 
 F. H. A. Scrivener, An Exact Transcript of the Codex Augiensis (Cambridge and London, 1859), pp. 57–58.

Greek New Testament minuscules
14th-century biblical manuscripts